Boitzenburger Land is a municipality in the Uckermark district, in Brandenburg, Germany.

Geography
The municipality, with an area of  one of largest in Germany, is located in the northeastern part of Brandenburg, close to the border with the state of Mecklenburg-Vorpommern. The rural community is part of the Uckermark historic region, it is surrounded by extended forests and the Uckermark Lakes Nature Park. In the south, it borders the towns of Templin and Lychen.

History
A settlement named Bozineburc was first mentioned in a 1215 deed. After the whole Uckermark region had passed to the Margraves of Brandenburg according to the 1250 Treaty of Landin, a Cistercian monastery at the site was founded; documented since 1271, about the time when nearby Chorin Abbey was established. In 1536 the abbey was secularised during the Protestant Reformation and devastated by Danish troops in the Thirty Years' War one hundred years later.

Boitzenburg Castle was first mentioned in 1276, it was occupied by Margrave William I of Meissen in 1398 but returned to Brandenburg in 1415. From 1429 the estates were held by the Arnim noble family. Damaged in the Thirty Years' War, when it was a possession of Field Marshal Hans Georg von Arnim-Boitzenburg, the fortress was rebuilt by his descendants in a Baroque style from 1740 onwards. Refurbished according to plans designed by Friedrich August Stüler between 1838 and 1842, it received its present Neo-Renaissance appearance in 1881–1884. The adjacent landscape garden was laid out by Peter Joseph Lenné around 1840. Boitzenburg was then held by Adolf Heinrich von Arnim-Boitzenburg, who became the first Minister President of Prussia in 1848.

After World War II, the Arnim family was disseized and the castle was used as recreation home of the East German National People's Army. Today it houses a hotel. The present-day municipality was established by the merger of ten villages in 1992.

Demography

People from Boitzenburger Land 
 Hans Georg von Arnim-Boitzenburg (1583-1641) German field marshal and landowner
 Georg Abraham von Arnim (1651-1734), Prussian field marshal and landowner
 Adolf von Arnim-Boitzenburg (1832-1887), Prussian politician and landowner
 Joachim Dietlof von Arnim-Boitzenburg (1898–1972), landowner

References

External links

 

Localities in Uckermark (district)